KLRX (97.3 FM; "K-Love") is a radio station in the Kansas City, Missouri-Kansas City, Kansas area that plays contemporary Christian music. The station is licensed to Lee's Summit, and broadcasts at 55,000 watts with a transmitter located in east Kansas City, Missouri.

History

KCSX (1998–2003)
Originally, KCSX was a country music station based in Moberly, Missouri. In 1998, First Broadcasting moved the station's transmitter and target area to Kansas City, who sold half of ownership of the station to Union Broadcasting. This was a rare occasion where two companies shared programming of one radio station. In 2002, the station moved their transmitter further into the Kansas City market, causing two stations in Kansas to change frequencies (Topeka-based WIBW-FM moved from 97.3 to 94.5, while Junction City station KJCK-FM moved from 94.5 to 97.5).

KZPL "The Planet" (2003–2005)
On January 20, 2003, the station dropped its country music format and began stunting by playing nothing but songs by The Beatles for one week, followed by similar daylong marathons of music from The Rolling Stones, Led Zeppelin, U2, Aerosmith, Van Halen, and Metallica. At Midnight on February 10, the new adult album alternative format known as "The Planet" debuted, with "The World I Know" by Collective Soul being the first song played. For the first month, all programming was fed via satellite from Dallas. Dubbed as "World Class Rock", KZPL gathered a small yet devoted following. However, it sat consistently near the bottom of most ratings charts throughout its two-year existence, namely due to numerous format tweaks. The station was a primary sponsor of the Wakarusa Music and Camping Festival in its initial years when based in nearby Lawrence, Kansas.

In Spring 2003, arguments between both ownership companies resulted in First Broadcasting taking Union Broadcasting to court, eventually leading to the full sale of the station to Union. The station served as the FM affiliate for the Kansas City Royals starting with the 2004 season, sharing duties with sister station WHB. KZPL aired games that began at 6:00 p.m. or later, when WHB's AM signal was harder to pick up.

Several of the programs and air personalities who aired on The Planet are now on similarly formatted KTBG.

KCXM "MAX-FM" (2005–2007)
On September 16, 2005, after playing "Last Goodbye" by Jeff Buckley, KZPL flipped to Album Rock as "97-3 Max FM", which started with "For Those About to Rock (We Salute You)" by AC/DC. The letters KCXM were implemented November 2, 2005. Since its sign-on, "Max FM" used the "Everything That Rocks" slogan. A few days after the sign-on, rival classic rocker KYYS began using exactly the same slogan, but quickly phased it out. KCXM was registered with Arbiton to use the slogan. As a rock station, KCXM never garnered the ratings Union had hoped for, and also struggled to make money. Shortly after the format change, program director Bryan Truta announced he was leaving for rival station KCJK.

"Max FM" competed against longtime FM rock stations KQRC, KYYS and KCFX. Kansas City native Erich "Mancow" Muller's Chicago-based morning show, Mancow's Morning Madhouse, aired weekdays from 5 a.m. to 10 a.m. The station added DJs in September 2006 as part of the celebration of the station being on air for one year. Murphy Wells (formerly of KQRC) did middays, Kenny Holland and Ozone did afternoons as "KAOS", and Scooter did nights. The station also added the syndicated program "Rockline" and retained "Little Steven's Underground Garage" from its AAA days. The station continued to air evening games of the Kansas City Royals until Union's contract expired and games moved to KCSP (AM).

"ESPN Radio 97.3" (2007)
On January 4, 2007, after playing "Selling the Drama" by Live, KCXM dropped the rock format and became "ESPN Radio 97.3," a full-time affiliate of ESPN Radio. The station dropped most local hosts at this time, but continued to air local games and play by play. KCXM complimented its sister station, WHB, which carries a mostly local sports talk format.

On November 30, 2007, KCXM was sold to EMF Broadcasting for $16 million. At midnight on December 1, 2007, KCXM began broadcasting K-LOVE programming. Just before the launch of K-LOVE, 97.3 reverted to its AAA format as "The Planet" for a few hours.

KLRX "K-Love" (2007-present)
On December 20, 2007, KCXM changed its callsign to KLRX, completing the transition. However, KLRX aired several sports events after the change to K-LOVE: a college basketball game between Kansas State and Oklahoma and at least one UMKC basketball game. It is likely that these games were "farmed out" from WHB, due to a schedule conflict. Once the sale was completed, the station ceased airing sporting events. EMF Broadcasting has its Kansas City office on the first floor of the Union Broadcasting Building in Overland Park, Kansas.

References

External links

K-Love radio stations
LRX
LRX
Radio stations established in 1999
1999 establishments in Missouri
Educational Media Foundation radio stations